Stephen Wallace (born August 18, 1987) is an American stock car racing driver. A current super late model racer, he is the son of 1989 Winston Cup champion Rusty Wallace, the nephew of NASCAR drivers Kenny and Mike Wallace, and cousin of Chrissy Wallace. Steve has made starts in all three of NASCAR's national series as well as the ARCA Racing Series, and won the Snowball Derby in 2004.

Racing career

Early racing
Between 1998 and 2002, Wallace raced in INEX Bandoleros. He captured multiple series championships. Steve raced in Legends cars and late model racecars near his hometown of Mooresville, North Carolina. He won both the Summer Shootout (twice) and Winter Shootout (once) at Lowe's Motor Speedway. He also won multiple championships at Concord Motor Speedway. In December 2004, at the age of 17, he won one of the biggest short track races in the country, the Snowball Derby, in Pensacola, Florida, a race Rusty and Kenny both entered, but failed to win in their careers. Steve was also the 2004 UARA Rookie of The Year. He won the first ever late model race at Bristol Motor Speedway.

In 2005, he ran nearly the entire season in USAR Hooters Pro Cup competition. He finished with 3 Top 10 finishes and qualified for the post-season championship series. A day after Steve turned 18, he became the youngest winner at a Michigan International Speedway event in an ARCA race while driving a Penske Racing Dodge. He raced in ARCA with several other teams that season. He also finished 15th in his first NASCAR Nationwide Series race at Memphis Motorsports Park (after starting 11th). Wallace became part of the Dodge factory driver development program.

Nationwide Series

Wallace raced 17 races in the #64 Dodge Nationwide Series car in 2006 (sharing with Jamie McMurray), as well as six ARCA series races in a Penske Racing car. Wallace won ARCA races at Michigan International Speedway and Kentucky Speedway, and had a best finish of 11th in the Busch Series.

For the 2007 NASCAR Busch Series season he would race full-time. He won his first career pole at Bristol Motor Speedway. Steve Wallace won his second pole on June 9, 2007, at Nashville Superspeedway in Lebanon, Tennessee. Before the conclusion of the 2007 Nationwide Series Season, it was announced that Wallace would be switching from Dodge to Chevy for the 2008 Season.

His first career top five came at Richmond International Raceway on May 2, 2008.

At the beginning of the 2012 season, he was without a car because of the temporary closure of Rusty Wallace Racing. After missing the first six races, he announced that he would make his first start of the season at Richmond International Speedway during the Virginia 529 College Savings 250.

Sprint Cup Series
Wallace made his Cup Series debut in the 2011 Daytona 500. Penske Racing transferred the owner points of his No. 77, whose 30th-place finish in 2010 guaranteed Wallace a start. He drove the No. 77 Toyota to a 20th-place finish.

Camping World Truck Series
In 2010 Wallace ran a partial Truck Series Schedule for Billy Ballew Motorsports finishing fourth in his debut at Atlanta.

On July 10, 2013, it was announced that Wallace will return to the Truck Series with Adrian Carriers Racing for four races starting with the American Ethanol 200.

Super late model career
After his NASCAR career ended, Wallace began racing super late model race cars. At a CARS Tour-sanctioned race at Fairgrounds Speedway in 2018, Wallace was parked early in the race for wrecking Mason Mingus and later fought with Mingus and his Wauters Motorsports team. After the fight, Wallace said that the incident was one worthy of the beginning of a war.

Personal life
Wallace is the youngest son of ESPN announcer and former NASCAR driver Rusty Wallace. He has been diagnosed with Tourette syndrome.

Images

Motorsports career results

NASCAR
(key) (Bold - Pole position awarded by time. Italics - Pole position earned by points standings. * – Most laps led.)

Sprint Cup Series

Daytona 500

Nationwide Series

Camping World Truck Series

 Ineligible for series points

ARCA Re/Max Series
(key) (Bold – Pole position awarded by qualifying time. Italics – Pole position earned by points standings or practice time. * – Most laps led.)

References

External links

 
 
 Things looking up for Wallace's son in Gateway races

Living people
1987 births
Racing drivers from Charlotte, North Carolina
NASCAR drivers
ARCA Menards Series drivers
CARS Tour drivers
People with Tourette syndrome
Wallace family
ARCA Midwest Tour drivers